Kévin Zonzon (born 6 July 1989) is a footballer who plays as a midfielder for CO Vincennes. Born in France, he represents Saint Martin internationally. Besides France, he has played in Slovakia.

Career

In 2010, Zonzon signed for Slovak second-tier side Zemplín Michalovce. Before the second half of 2011–12, he was sent on loan to Spišská Nová Ves in the Slovak third tier.  Before the second half of 2012–13, Zonzon signed for French fourth tier club Maccabi Paris, where he suffered relegation to the French sixth tier. In 2018, he signed for Blanc-Mesnil in the French fifth tier. In 2021, Zonzon signed for French sixth tier team CO Vincennes.

References

External links
 

FK Spišská Nová Ves players
2. Liga (Slovakia) players
3. Liga (Slovakia) players
Living people
French expatriate sportspeople in Slovakia
Saint Martinois footballers
Saint Martin international footballers
UJA Maccabi Paris Métropole players
MFK Zemplín Michalovce players
French expatriate footballers
Championnat National 3 players
Expatriate footballers in Slovakia
French footballers
Association football midfielders
1989 births
Championnat National 2 players